Akutan Volcano
Amak Volcano
Amukta Volcano
Bobrof Volcano
Bogoslof Volcano
Buldir Volcano
Chagulak Volcano
Carlisle Volcano
Cleveland Volcano
Davidof Volcano
Gareloi Volcano
Great Sitkin Volcano
Herbert Volcano
Kagamil Volcano
Kanaga Volcano
Kasatochi Volcano
Kiska Volcano
Koniuji Volcano
Korovin Volcano
Little Sitkin Volcano
Pogromni Volcano
Seguam Volcano
Segula Volcano
Semisopochnoi Volcano
Tanaga Volcano
Uliaga Volcano
Vsevidof Volcano
Yunaska Volcano

 
Volcanoes
Aleutian